"Buy Broom Buzzems" (or "Buy Broom Besums") is a song attributed by many to William Purvis, probably better known as "Blind Willie" (1752–1832), a Tyneside songwriter and performer in the end of the 18th and start of the 19th century, and is considered by many to be his piece de resistance.

Possible authorship 

William Purvis is described as the writer/composer of this piece by many books and journals, while others dispute this. There is no real evidence either way.  But what can be said is that he made it his own and he was in the habit of adding new verses and removing old verses as it suited him. These verses may have been written by himself or by others for him, and usually had no connection with the original theme. There are several other versions of the song. One version was popular just over the border in Southern Scotland and of which Rabbie Burns, for one, knew  and in 1796 wrote a satirical piece, Buy Braw Troggin, set to the tune. Another version, The Besom Maker or Green Besoms, although it shares a refrain with this song, is otherwise quite different (the Roud Index assigns it number 910) and can be seen, as The Besom Maker, at Bodleian Library Broadside Ballads.

The lyrics 

"Broom Buzzems" refers to brooms (besoms). For a translation of other words, see Geordie dialect words.

Part 1 – the main (original) verses:

Part 2 – to the original, these are some of the new wimple verses that Blind Willie (the native minstrel of Newcastle) had added:

Recordings

  Richard Lewis CBE (10 May 1914 – 13 November 1990) was a Welsh tenor
   YouTube recording by Richard Lewis 
   YouTube recording by Northumbrian Smallpipes (in dialect) 
 YouTube recording by Ray Beasley

References

External links
 [The Newcastle Song Book or Tyne-Side Songster W&T Fordyce Newcastle upon Tyne]
 Conrad Bladey's Beuk O' Newcassel Sangs

English folk songs